Frodospira cochleata is a species of extinct sea snail in the family Lophospiridae.  Fossil specimens from 422.9 and 421.3 million years ago have been found in Sweden at Grogarnsberget, Hemse, and Sandarve kulle, in a hill about a kilometer north of Fardhem Church.  A species of epifaunal filter feeder, it had a slender, turriculate shell consisting of twelve to thirteen whorls.

References

Fossil taxa described in 1884
Extinct gastropods